Mediriya is a village in Sri Lanka. It is located within Central Province. The Latitude is 7° 17' 59" N and the Longitude is 80° 52' 59" E. It has a tropical rainforest climate.

See also
List of towns in Central Province, Sri Lanka

References

External links

Populated places in Kandy District